Pteruges (also spelled pteryges) refers to strip-like defences for the upper parts of limbs attached to armor in the Greco-Roman world.

Appearance and variation

Pteruges formed a defensive skirt of leather or multi-layered fabric (linen) strips or lappets worn dependant from the waists of Roman and Greek cuirasses of warriors and soldiers, defending the hips and thighs. Similar defenses, epaulette-like strips, were worn on the shoulders, protecting the upper arms. Both sets of strips are usually interpreted as belonging to a single garment worn under a cuirass, though in a linen cuirass (linothorax) they may have been integral. The cuirass itself could be  variously constructed: of plate-bronze (muscle cuirass), linothorax, scale, lamellar or mail. Pteruges could be arranged as a single row of longer strips or in two or more layers of shorter, overlapping lappets of graduated length.

Possible later use
During the Middle Ages, especially in the Byzantine Empire and in the Middle East, such strips are depicted descending from the back and sides of helmets, to protect the neck while leaving it reasonably free to move. However, no archaeological remains of leather strip defenses for helmets have been found. Artistic depictions of such strip-like elements can also be interpreted as vertically-stitched quilted textile defenses.

See also
Roman military personal equipment
Ancient Roman military clothing

References

Bibliography

External links
Article about how to build pteruges

Roman-era clothing
Greek clothing
Byzantine clothing
Ancient_Roman_legionary_equipment
Ancient Greek military terminology
Ancient Greek military equipment
Byzantine military equipment